Jerry Cotton is a 2010 German action comedy film directed by Philipp Stennert and Cyrill Boss and starring Christian Tramitz, Christian Ulmen and Mónica Cruz. It is a re-boot of the Jerry Cotton series of films. FBI agent Jerry Cotton fights crime in New York City. On December 17 and 26 2012 it was shown on HBO Asia in Original German language with English subtitles.

Cast

References

External links
 

2010 films
2010 action comedy films
2010s buddy comedy films
2010s crime comedy films
2010s gang films
2010s parody films
Buddy comedy films
German action comedy films
German crime comedy films
2010s German-language films
Films set in the United States
2010s police comedy films
Films based on German novels
2010s buddy cop films
German parody films
2010 comedy films
2010s German films